Deep Run is a tributary of Broad Creek in Beaufort County, North Carolina in the United States.

References

Rivers of North Carolina